"Black Dog" is a song by English rock band Led Zeppelin, the opening track on the band's untitled fourth album (1971). The song was released as a single and reached the charts in several countries; however, as was their practice, it was not issued in the United Kingdom. The song was included in Rolling Stones (US) "the 500 Greatest Songs of All Time" and ranked No. 1 in Q magazine's (UK) "20 Greatest Guitar Tracks".

Composition

"Black Dog" is built around a call and response dynamic between the vocalist and band, with its start and stop a cappella verses inspired by Fleetwood Mac's 1969 song "Oh Well", according to biographer Dave Lewis. The title is a reference to a nameless black Labrador Retriever that wandered around the Headley Grange studios during the recording of the album. The song was recorded with recording engineer Andy Johns at Island Studios on Basing Street in London.

Bassist John Paul Jones, who is credited with writing the main riff, was inspired by Muddy Waters' controversial 1968 album Electric Mud.  He added a winding riff and complex rhythm changes, that biographer Keith Shadwick describes as a "clever pattern that turns back on itself more than once, crossing between time signatures as it does." The group had a difficult time with the turnaround, but drummer John Bonham's solution was to play it straight through as if there was no turnaround.  In live performances, Bonham eliminated the  variation so that Robert Plant could perform his a cappella vocal interludes and then have the instruments return at the proper time. For his guitar parts, Jimmy Page used a Gibson Les Paul to record multiple overdubs.

Release
The song was released as a single in the United States on 2 December 1971, in continental Europe (the United Kingdom did not receive the single release), and in Australia with "Misty Mountain Hop" as the B-side.

Live performances
"Black Dog" became a staple of Led Zeppelin's live concert performances. It was first played live at Belfast's Ulster Hall on 5 March 1971, a concert which also featured the first ever live performance of "Stairway to Heaven". It was retained for each subsequent concert tour until 1973. In 1975 it was used as an encore medley with "Whole Lotta Love", but was hardly used on the band's 1977 US concert tour. It was recalled to the set for the Knebworth Festival 1979 and the 1980 Tour of Europe. For these final 1980 performances, Page introduced the song from stage.

Reception
In 2004, the song was first ranked number 294 on Rolling Stones list of the 500 Greatest Songs of All Time before being ranked at number 300 in 2010. Music sociologist Deena Weinstein calls "Black Dog" "one of the most instantly recognisable [Led] Zeppelin tracks".

* designates unordered lists.

Charts and certifications

Original release

Digital download

Note: The official UK Singles Chart incorporated legal downloads as of 17 April 2005.

Certifications

See also
List of cover versions of Led Zeppelin songs
List of Led Zeppelin songs written or inspired by others

Notes
Citations

References

External links

1971 singles
1971 songs
Atlantic Records singles
Led Zeppelin songs
Songs written by Jimmy Page
Songs written by John Paul Jones (musician)
Songs written by Robert Plant
Song recordings produced by Jimmy Page